Notohadinegoro Stadium is a football stadium in the town of Jember, Indonesia. The stadium has a capacity of 15,000 people.

It is the home base of Persid Jember .

References

Sports venues in Indonesia
Football venues in Indonesia
Multi-purpose stadiums in Indonesia